Neohypodiscus is a genus of fungi in the family Boliniaceae. The genus contains three widely distributed species.

References

Sordariomycetes genera
Boliniales